Val Nicholas Bezic (born December 8, 1952) is a Canadian pair skater. With his sister Sandra Bezic, he won the Canadian Figure Skating Championships from 1970–1974 and placed ninth at the 1972 Winter Olympics. He is of Croatian descent.

Results
Pair skating with Sandra Bezic

Literature 
Eterovich, Adam S. Croatia at the Olympics, 1890s-1980s (!?!).  // CROWN – Croatian World Network, [Bach, Nenad N. (ed.)], 08/3/2004, Retrieved 2010-02-17

References

External links
 

1952 births
Canadian male pair skaters
Canadian people of Croatian descent
Figure skaters at the 1972 Winter Olympics
Olympic figure skaters of Canada
Living people
Figure skaters from Toronto